Goyang Stadium is a multi-purpose stadium in Goyang, South Korea used mostly for football matches and was the home ground of Goyang Zaicro FC of the K League Challenge from 2013-16. The seating capacity is 41,311 and construction was completed in 2003. It is occasionally used for matches of the South Korea national football team.

References

External links
 Official website  
 Goyang Sports Facilities Management Center 
 World Stadiums
 Goyang Stadium 

Football venues in South Korea
Athletics (track and field) venues in South Korea
Sports venues in Gyeonggi Province
Multi-purpose stadiums in South Korea
Sport in Goyang
Goyang Zaicro FC
Venues of the 2014 Asian Games
Buildings and structures in Goyang
Sports venues completed in 2003
2003 establishments in South Korea
K League 2 stadiums